This is a list of flag bearers who have represented Cameroon at the Olympics.

Flag bearers carry the national flag of their country at the opening ceremony of the Olympic Games.

See also
Cameroon at the Olympics

References

Cameroon at the Olympics
Cameroon
Olympic